Keep It Right There is an album by the American musician Marion Meadows, released in 1992. The album peaked in the top 10 on the Billboard Jazz Albums chart. Meadows supported the album with a tour.

"Come Back to Me" is a cover of the Janet Jackson song.

Track listing 
"Wishing" – 	5:13
"In Effect" – 3:49
"Love Was Never" – 5:04
"Morocco" – 4:57
"Come Back to Me" – 5:35
"Color of Love" 	 – 5:03
"Keep It Right There" – 5:02
"Oh Yes" 	 – 4:47
"Heaven" – 1:17
"Good Lovin'" – 5:14
"When Will I Know" – 5:31
"Passion" – 7:14

References

External links 
Album at Last.fm

Marion Meadows albums
1992 albums
Novus Records albums